Mellein is a dihydroisocoumarin, a phenolic compound produced by the mold species Aspergillus ochraceus.

Derivatives 
4-Hydroxymellein is also produced by Aspergillus ochraceus.

6-Hydroxymellein, together with S-adenosyl methionine, is a substrate of the enzyme 6-hydroxymellein O-methyltransferase to form 6-methoxymellein and S-adenosylhomocysteine in Apiaceae. 6-Methoxymellein is one of the compounds responsible for bitterness in carrots.

References

Dihydroisocoumarins